The Spring Stakes is a Japanese Grade 2 flat horse race in Japan for three-year-old Thoroughbred colts and fillies run over a distance of 1,800 metres at Nakayama Racecourse, Funabashi, Chiba. The race is run in March and serves as a major trial race for the Satsuki Sho.

It was first run in 1952. Among the winners of the race have been Shinzan, Narita Brian, Bubble Gum Fellow, Neo Universe, Meisho Samson and Orfevre.

Winners since 1994

Earlier winners

 1952 - Asatomo
 1953 - Cheerio
 1954 - Taka O
 1955 - Nancy Shine
 1956 - Kitano O
 1957 - Hikaru Meiji
 1958 - Daigo Homare
 1959 - Meitai
 1960 - Kodama
 1961 - Yukiro
 1962 - Kanetsu Seki
 1963 - Meizui
 1964 - Shinzan
 1965 - Dai Koter
 1966 - Shogun
 1967 - Mejiro Flame
 1968 - Marchs
 1969 - Wild More
 1970 - Tanino Moutiers
 1971 - Mejiro Gekko
 1972 - Tai Tehm
 1973 - Haiseko
 1974 - Kitano Kochidoki
 1975 - Long Hawk
 1976 - Ten Point
 1977 - Yoshino Ryujin
 1978 - Takeden
 1979 - Rikiai O
 1980 - Sir Pen Prince
 1981 - Sanei Tholon
 1982 - Hagino Kamui O
 1983 - Takeno Hien
 1984 - Bizen Nihiki
 1985 - Miho Shinzan
 1986 - Sunny Light
 1987 - Material
 1988 - Mogami Nine
 1989 - Narcisse Noir
 1990 - Azuma East
 1991 - Shin Horisky
 1992 - Mihono Bourbon
 1993 - Multi Max

See also
 Horse racing in Japan
 List of Japanese flat horse races

References

Turf races in Japan
1952 establishments in Japan
Recurring sporting events established in 1952